"We All Stand Together" (sometimes referred to as the Frog Song or the Frog Chorus) is a song by Paul McCartney and the Frog Chorus.

History
"We All Stand Together" is from the animated film Rupert and the Frog Song and reached number three in the UK Singles Chart in 1984. 
The "Frog Chorus" backing on the song was provided by The King's Singers and the choir of St Paul's Cathedral. The B-side of the single contains a "Humming Version" of the song performed by the Finchley Frogettes.

The song re-entered the UK Singles Chart in 1985, one of three hits to do so that had originally charted in December 1984. ("Do They Know It's Christmas?" by Band Aid and "Last Christmas" by Wham! were the other two.)

Although intended purely as a children's song in the mould of the Beatles' "Yellow Submarine", "We All Stand Together" is sometimes derided as an example of McCartney's inconsequential songwriting by his critics. In a satirical cartoon by Stephen Collins of The Guardian in 2012, McCartney is shown recalling his creative partnership with John Lennon in the 1960s, before concluding: "It was a great time, y'know ... And then I went on to do The Frog Song."

Personnel
Paul McCartney – lead and backing vocals
 Nigel Perrin - vocals
 Alastair Hume - vocals
 Anthony Holt - vocals
 Simon Carrington - vocals
 Brian Kay - vocals
 The London Community Gospel Choir - vocals
The King's Singers – backing vocals
Eric Stewart - backing vocals
 Pete Swinfield – flute
 John Barclay - trumpet
 Pete Beachill - euphonium
 Robin Williams - violin
 Gary Kettel - timpani

Release
Two shaped picture discs were issued on the 12 November 1984 and 1985, the only difference being a plain clear sleeve on the later version. In 1987, the song was included on the UK/Canada version of McCartney's compilation album All the Best! It also appears on the deluxe edition of his 2016 compilation album Pure McCartney. In October 2020, for the 100th anniversary of the Rupert character, the single was remastered for streaming and a vinyl re-release of the picture disc, alongside a 4K restoration of the accompanying short.

Charts

Weekly charts

Year-end charts

Choirs with Purpose version

In 2017, Choirs with Purpose, a collection of a dozen charity choirs, assembled for a remake of "We All Stand Together". Their recording features Scottish singer Michelle McManus in a bid to top the UK Singles Chart Christmas chart and win the coveted British Christmas number one for 2017; it failed to make the top 100. Profits from the single were split equally between the participating choirs in aid of their own charity work.

The choirs that took part in the recording with McManus include:
Anstee Bridge Choir
Cystic Fibrosis Virtual Choir
Daniel Spargo-Mabbs Foundation Choir
Games Maker Choir
Homelink Carers Choir
Lewisham and Greenwich NHS Choir
Lucy Lintott / MND Scotland Choir
Maggies Cancer Centre (West London) Choir
Missing People Choir
Parrs Wood High School Harmony Group
Pop Up Purpose Choir
UK Hospices Choir

References

1984 songs
Paul McCartney songs
Songs written by Paul McCartney
Rupert Bear
Music published by MPL Music Publishing
English children's songs
Songs written for films
Songs about comics
Song recordings produced by George Martin